Imperial baths were the great bathing establishments built by the Romans during the period of classical antiquity including:

 Baths of Caracalla
 Baths of Diocletian
 Trier Imperial Baths